Colonel Georg (Yrjö) Elfvengren (8 September 1889, Sortavala – 10 June 1927, Moscow) was a Finnish officer of the Russian Imperial Guard during the First World War and a noted commander of the Finnish Civil War and Heimosodat, who sympathized with the Russian White movement and fought against Finnish and Russian Red Guards on the Karelian Isthmus on both sides of the Finland-Russia border. From November 1919 to May 1920 he was the chairman of the governing council of the Republic of North Ingria. Presumably an ethnic Belarusian from his mother's side, for some period he has also served as a diplomat for the Belarusian Democratic Republic in Finland. He was executed by shooting in Moscow in 1927.

References 
 Yrjö Elfvengren, the soldier of Russia and Finland (Russian) (Finnish)

1889 births
1927 deaths
People from Sortavala
People from Viipuri Province (Grand Duchy of Finland)
Military personnel of the Russian Empire
Russian military personnel of World War I
People of the Finnish Civil War (White side)
Belarusian diplomats
Finnish military personnel
Executed Finnish people
History of the Karelian Isthmus
Ingria
Finnish people executed by the Soviet Union
Russian people of Finnish descent
Russian people of Belarusian descent
Finnish people of Belarusian descent
Executed Russian people